Ivan Roudyk (born 1976 in Novosibirsk, Russia, Soviet Union) is a popular Russian House DJ.

Biography 
Ivan Roudyk was born in 1976 in Novosibirsk to a family of engineers. He expressed an interest for music from a young age. In an interview he mentioned "Come Together" by the Beatles as one of his first musical influences at five years old. His parents, however, chose to send their son at age seven to a sports school where he trained to become an ice hockey player. When Roudyk was 13, he went to a disco party for the first time in his life. He mentioned the playing of "Pump Up The Jam" by Technotronic as an inspiring moment. At 16, Roudyk left professional sports and began to work in one of the night clubs in Novosibirsk. 1992 marked the start of his career as a DJ. In 1996, he became the resident DJ at a house club called Faust. In 1997 a large Russian network radio stations "Europe Plus" offered Roudyk a weekly show dance music show.

Two years later, Roudyk moved to Moscow where his career quickly took off. In March 1999 he became the resident DJ of Club XIII and two months later he signed a contract with the club Gallery. In 2000 a Moscow club called Zeppelin which became one of the most popular in the city after its opening acquired Roudyk as their DJ. In 2002 Roudyk received an offer from the large Moscow radio station "Hit FM" to do a weekly show. His show "Electrica" aired for the first time on October 19, 2002 and after only a month became one of the station's most popular shows. "Electrica" featured visits of notable electronic musicians such as Basement Jaxx, Dirty Vegas, and Paul Oakenfold among others.

In April 2003, Roudyk received an offer from the club IT in Amsterdam to play at the party “From Russia With Love”. Later that year the Russian magazine “DJ-culture”' named Roudyk in the list of the Top 10 Russian DJs in its May issue. The summer of 2003 saw Roudyk as a headliner at the international festival FortDanceTrip in St. Petersburg where he played a two-hour set between performances by Sander Kleinenberg and Daniel Davoli. In September 2003, Roudyk launched his official site, a booking agency and a record label under the name of his radio show "Electrica". At the start of 2004 his show was moved to “Energy FM", a new Russian station devoted to electronic music. In May 2004, Roudyk performed at the Gatecrasher festival. He has recently released two successful albums with Diamond Records in Russia. At the close of 2006, Roudyk was voted by thousands Russian club-goers at dj.ru as the best DJ in Russia.

External links 
Roudyk's radioshow website (Russian)
Roudyk's official website (Russian)

1976 births
Living people
Club DJs
Musicians from Novosibirsk
Remixers
Russian electronic musicians
Russian house musicians